Kulavadhu is a 1963 Indian Kannada-language film, directed by T. V. Singh Takur and produced by A. C. Narasimha Murthy & Friends. The film stars Rajkumar, Leelavathi, Balakrishna, Narasimharaju and K. S. Ashwath. The film has musical score by G. K. Venkatesh. The famous Ugadi song Yuga Yugadi Kaledaru from this movie is a still hit song. The movie is based on the novel of same name by Krishnamoorthy Puranik. This was Rajkumar's second movie to be based on a novel - the first being Karuneye Kutumbada Kannu (1962). Both the movies were based on novels by Krishnamoorthy Puranik.

Cast

Rajkumar
Balakrishna
Narasimharaju
K. S. Ashwath
Venkatasubbaiah
Ashwath Narayana
Aadishesh
Shenoy
Kuppuraj
Raman
Bhujanga Rao
Basappa
Master Udayashankar
Leelavathi
B. Jayashree
Papamma
Sharadamma
Sadhana (Revathidevi)

Soundtrack
The music was composed by G. K. Venkatesh.

References

External links
 

1963 films
1960s Kannada-language films
Films scored by G. K. Venkatesh